Arctia murzini is a moth in the family Erebidae. It was described by Vladimir Viktorovitch Dubatolov in 2005. It is found in Shaanxi, China.

This species was formerly a member of the genus Platarctia, but was moved to Arctia along with the other species of the genera Acerbia, Pararctia, Parasemia, Platarctia, and Platyprepia.

References

Moths described in 2005
Arctiina